The Vam Nao River or Lao Vam is a 6.5 kilometre river in An Giang Province, Vietnam, running near the Vietnam-Cambodia border. It connects the Tien River with the Hau River. Vam Nao has an important role for the Cuu Long River Delta in irrigation and transport. Vam Nao is also famed for being the place of a fierce naval battle between the Vietnamese and the Siamese, and also because of its reef fish and catfish. ON average the river is 700 metres wide and 17 metres deep.

Rivers of An Giang province
Mekong Delta
Rivers of Vietnam